Anjoman'ankona is a rural municipality in Madagascar. It belongs to the district of Manandriana, which is a part of Amoron'i Mania Region. The population of is 7,021 inhabitants.

Economy
There are crystal mines nearby.

References 

Populated places in Amoron'i Mania